Patuxent High School (pronounced- Pa-tucks-ent) is a comprehensive, four-year public high school in Lusby, Calvert County, Maryland, United States. The school draws from the communities of Cove Point, the Chesapeake Ranch Estates, Drum Point and Solomons. Patuxent has 69 certified teachers, four full time counselors and a full time registrar who serve 1073 total students and 257 seniors (in 2019–20).

Athletics
Patuxent is a 2A school that competes in the Southern Maryland Athletic Conference (SMAC).

Notable alumni
Joey Jett, professional skateboarder
Robert McClain, American football cornerback

References

Public high schools in Maryland
Schools in Calvert County, Maryland
Educational institutions established in 1996
1996 establishments in Maryland